Derivation may refer to:

Language
 Morphological derivation, a word-formation process
 Parse tree or concrete syntax tree, representing a string's syntax in formal grammars

Law
 Derivative work, in copyright law
 Derivation proceeding, a proceeding in United States patent law

Music
 The creation of a derived row, in the twelve-tone musical technique

Science and mathematics
 Derivation (differential  algebra), a unary function satisfying the Leibniz product law
 Formal proof or derivation, a sequence of sentences each of which is an axiom or follows from the preceding sentences in the sequence by a rule of inference
 An after-the-fact justification for an action, in the work of sociologist Vilfredo Pareto

See also
Derive (disambiguation), for meanings of "derive" and "derived"
Derivative, in calculus
Derivative (disambiguation)